Reducción de Santa María la Mayor (Reduction of Holy Maria Major), located in the Santa María Department of the Misiones Province, Argentina, at approximate coordinates , was one of the missions or reductions founded in the 17th century by the Jesuits in the Americas during the Spanish colonial period. In 1984 it was one of four reduction sites in Argentina designated as World Heritage Sites by UNESCO.

Jesuit Reductions
The Jesuit reduction of Santa María la Mayor was founded in 1626, and by 1744 it held a population of 993. It was abandoned after the Jesuits were expelled from the Spanish colonies in 1767 after suppression of the order by the Spanish and Portuguese governments.

World Heritage Site
In 1984 the ruins of the reduction were declared a World Heritage Site by UNESCO, together with three other reductions in the area of Argentina and one in Brazil, all formerly part of the Province of Paraguay during the colonial era. The ruins have been grown over by vegetation. They are not as well preserved as those of San Ignacio Miní, also in Misiones.

See also
 Jesuit Reductions
 List of Jesuit sites

References

Jesuit Missions of the Guaranis
Spanish missions in Argentina
Buildings and structures in Misiones Province
Former populated places in Argentina
1626 establishments in the Viceroyalty of Peru
1767 disestablishments in the Viceroyalty of Peru
World Heritage Sites in Argentina
Governorate of the Río de la Plata